Postplatyptilia talcaica is a moth of the family Pterophoridae. It is known from Chile.

The wingspan is about 18 mm. Adults are on wing in January.

References

talcaica
Moths described in 1991
Endemic fauna of Chile